Nur Yalman is a leading Turkish social anthropologist at Harvard University, where he serves as senior Research Professor of Social Anthropology and Middle Eastern Studies.

Career
Yalman received his high school diploma from Robert College, Istanbul, one of Turkey’s premier private high schools. For his BA and PhD, he studied Social Anthropology at Cambridge University under the mentorship of Edmund Leach and carried out fieldwork in Sri Lanka. At Cambridge, Yalman was a Bye-Fellow of Peterhouse, and subsequently joined the anthropology faculty at the University of Chicago. During his stay at Chicago, he served as director for the Center for Middle Eastern Studies from 1968-1972.  He then joined the Harvard University faculty in 1972. Yalman is also a fellow of the American Academy of Arts and Sciences. He also served on the Social Sciences jury for the Infosys Prize in 2010.

Although his first book, Under the Bo Tree, was on Sri Lankan kinship and marriage, he has since expanded his research to include religion and politics in Middle Eastern and Muslim cultures. Not only has he written about many countries of the world, he has also conducted ethnographic fieldwork in Sri Lanka, India, Iran and Turkey. Yalman’s varied research interests are expressed in the wide number of languages he speaks: Turkish, English, French, German, some Persian, Sinhalese, Italian and Arabic.  He teaches courses on structuralist and post-structuralist theory and on issues of modernization and social change.

Published works 
A Passage to Peace: Global Solutions from East to West. A Dialogue with Daisaku Ikeda. I.B. Tauris, 2009,  
Under the Bo Tree: Studies in Caste, Kinship, and Marriage in the Interior of Ceylon. Berkeley, University of California Press, 1967.
"On the Purity of Women in the Castes of Ceylon and Malabar," The Journal of the Royal Anthropological Institute of Great Britain and Ireland,  Vol. 93, No. 1 (Jan., 1963), pp. 25–58  
"On Land Disputes in Eastern Turkey" in Tikku, Girdhari L., and Von Grunebaum, G. E.  Islam and its cultural divergence; studies in honor of Gustave E. von Grunebaum, edited by Girdhari L. Tikku,  University of Illinois Press Urbana,  1971
"De Tocqueville in India: An Essay on the Caste System," Man, New Series, Vol. 4, No. 1 (Mar., 1969), pp. 123–131
"The Structure of Sinhalese Healing Rituals," The Journal of Asian Studies,  Vol. 23, Aspects of Religion in South Asia (Jun., 1964), pp. 115–150

External links
interviewed by Alan Macfarlane on 14 June 2004 (video)

Turkish non-fiction writers
Turkish anthropologists
Academics from Istanbul
Yalman, Nur
Yalman, Nur
Yalman, Nur
University of Chicago faculty
Living people
Year of birth missing (living people)